The 2000 CAF Super Cup was the eighth CAF Super Cup, an annual football match in Africa organized by the Confederation of African Football (CAF), between the winners of the previous season's two CAF club competitions, the African Cup of Champions Clubs and the African Cup Winners' Cup.

Teams

Match details

References

External links 
 http://www.cafonline.com/competition/super-cup_2009/pastcomp/2000

2000
Super
March 2000 sports events in Africa